Mill Run is a  long 2nd order tributary to the Trent River in Jones County, North Carolina.

Course
Mill Run rises about 1 mile southwest of Olivers Crossroads, North Carolina and then flows northeast to join the Trent River about 1 mile southeast of Olivers Crossroads.

Watershed
Mill Run drains  of area, receives about 54.0 in/year of precipitation, has a wetness index of 617.78, and is about 18% forested.

See also
List of rivers of North Carolina

References

Rivers of North Carolina
Rivers of Jones County, North Carolina